Acción Latina is a Latino cultural nonprofit organization founded in 1970, and located in the Mission District at 2958-24th Street, San Francisco, California. They publish El Tecolote bilingual newspaper, lead the Paseo Artístico community art stroll, and operate the Juan R. Fuentes Gallery. Acción Latina hosts diverse community driven visual, literary and performing arts events. They also manage the digital archives of El Tecolote, which span 45 years of publications. 

The nonprofit was formed from a class group project at San Francisco State University in the 1970s.

See also 

 Chicano art movement
 Mexican Museum in San Francisco
 Mission Cultural Center for Latino Arts

References

External links 
 Official website
 Acción Latina records, approximately 1987-2010 at Bancroft Library, U.C. Berkeley

Hispanic and Latino American organizations
Non-profit organizations based in San Francisco
Arts organizations established in 1970
Arts organizations based in California
Art museums and galleries in San Francisco
Culture of San Francisco
Mission District, San Francisco
Archives in the United States